The list of leading Thoroughbred racehorses contains the names of undefeated racehorses and other horses that had an outstanding race record in specific categories. Note though that many champions do not appear on the list as an unexpected defeat may be caused by many factors such as injury, illness, going, racing tactics and differences in weight carried, the latter being particularly significant in North America and Australia where handicaps are common even at the highest level of racing.

It is common to compare racehorses on multiple factors such as their overall race record, the quality of the horses they beat and the brilliance of their wins. Comparison of raw times is generally unreliable between horses of different eras or even over different racecourses due to a variety of factors such as the racing surface and the pace at which the race is run. Timeform ratings, introduced in 1948, and Beyer Speed Figures, introduced in the United States in 1992, are relatively recent attempts to compensate for such variables. Thoroughbred Winning Brew holds the Guinness world record for the fastest speed from the starting gate for a Thoroughbred racehorse, at 70.76 km/h (43.97 mph) over two furlongs, although Quarter Horses attain higher speeds over shorter distances than Thoroughbreds. Such speeds may also be achieved by elite racehorses during the stretch drive.

The two main forms of Thoroughbred horseracing are flat racing and hurdle or steeplechase (jumping) races over obstacles. Jumpers tend to be older than their flat racing counterparts and can have much longer careers, making it possible to earn a large number of wins. For example, champion hurdler Hurricane Fly won a then-record 22 Grade One races over his ten-year career.

Most race horses and race winners are male horses (either intact males or geldings). While male and female horses do not exhibit sexual dimorphism as obviously as human athletes, male horses are considered more aggressive racers and generally have a significant competitive advantage. At the highest level of racing though, intact males have great economic value at stud, so they are often retired after only a few years of racing. In part because they may have longer racing careers, some of the most winning racehorses of all time are females, including Kincsem, Black Caviar, Winx, and Zenyatta.

Undefeated horses
Below is a list of Thoroughbred racehorses with an undefeated race record. The list is not comprehensive for otherwise unnotable horses with five or fewer starts.

Federico Tesio bred several undefeated champions including Nearco, Ribot, Braque, and Cavaliere d'Arpino, whom he considered the best horse that he ever bred.

Undefeated horses without five known starts
Nordlicht (chestnut horse 1941–1968, by Oleander x Nereide, by Laland) was also undefeated after an unknown number of starts. His victories included the Deutsches Derby and Austrian Derby. Middleton and Amato had one start each with both of them winning The Derby and then retiring. Cherimoya did likewise when she won The Oaks in her only start. Morston (colt by Ragusa x Windmill Girl by Hornbeam) had two starts, winning both, the second of which was the 1973 Epsom Derby. Sailor won both his races, including the 1820 Epsom Derby. Suspender had three starts, in smaller races, for three wins. Don Juan by Loyalist, Ball's Florizel (1801), Mirza by the Godolphin Arabian, and Lecturer (1869), were also unbeaten, but the number of their wins is unknown.

Most wins

There have been only 7 horses to win over 100 races, most of them coming from Puerto Rico in restricted racing. The all time record, recognized by the Guinness World Records, goes to Chorisbar who won 197 times over the course of 324 career starts. Condado, a chestnut horse who raced in Puerto Rico from 1936-1943, won a grand total of 152 times Galgo Jr earned 137 wins in 159 starts from 1930 to 1936. Cofresi won 119 races, racing at around the same time as Condado. 

In the United States, Kingston (by Spendthrift) had 138 starts and won 89 of these, including 30 stakes-races. According to the American Horse Racing Hall of Fame, his 89 wins set the all-time record. Commencing a winning sequence as a four-year-old on 21 August 1888, Kingston had 35 race starts until 30 May 1891 during which he was defeated only twice.  Bankrupt won 86 races from 348 starts, and he was also by Spendthrift. Tippety Witchet (1915, by Broomstick) started 266 times for 78 wins. Pan Zareta started 151 times with 76 wins and is considered to be the "winningest female Thoroughbred in American history".

Catherina (1830, by Whisker) started in 176 races and won 79 of them, many over long distances, including the Manchester Cup, Tradesmen's Cup, and Heaton Park's King's Cup. Many of Catherina's races were heat races, and she therefore actually faced the starter 298 times and was the first past the finish line 136 times, including two disqualifications, one walkover, and two dead-heats.

 197 – Chorisbar
 160 – Yaucono
 152 – Condado
 137 – Galgo Jr
 132  – Lenoxbar
 119 – Cofresi
 100 – Tite
 89 – Kingston
 86 – Bankrupt
 79 – Catherina(136 heats),Bachiller (PR)
 78 – Tippety Witchet,Cocoliso (PR)
 76 – Pan Zareta
 73 – Camarero
 70 – Fisherman
 65 – Jorrocks, Ritmo Criollo
 63 – Vuelve Candy B.
 62 – Imp

Successive victories

The horses who were defeated but had ten or more consecutive race wins include
 56 –
 Camarero (PR)
 49 – 
 Cofresi (PR)
 43 – 
 Condado (PR)
 39 –
 Galgo Jr (PR)
37 – 
Condado PR)
 33 –
 Winx (AUS)‡
32 – 
Bachiller (PR)
29 – 
Dojima Fighter
26 – 
Cofresi (PR)
25 – 
Tite (PR)
24 – 
Sicótico (DOM)
 23
 Leviathan (USA) (1793) 
 Cardiólogo (PR)
 Liberty Bay (CHI
 22
 Cocoliso (PR)
 Generations (USA) 
 Miss Petty (AUS)‡ 
 Pooker T (PR) 
 Rapid Redux (USA) 
 Second Melbourne (JPN)
 21
 Picnic in the Park (AUS) 
 (Bond's) First Consul (USA) 
 Lottery (USA)‡ 
 Meteor (GB)
 20
 Filch (IRE) 
 Kentucky (USA) 
 Fashion (USA)‡

 19
 Cheers Fancy (JPN)
 Desert Gold (NZ)‡ 
 Gloaming (AUS) 
 Light (FR) 
 Zenyatta (USA)‡ 
 Estrellero (PR) 
 The Hero (GB) 
 Altior (IRE)
 Sweetmeat (GB) 
 Capa Prieto (PR)
 18
 Ajax (AUS) 
 Sally Hope (USA)‡ 
 High Security(VEN) 
 Big Buck's (FR) 
 Hindoo (USA)
 17
 Bachiller (PR)
 Careless (Warren's, 1751)
 Condado (PR)
 Gay Lungi (AUS)
 Gradisco (VEN) 
 Hanover (USA) 
 Mainbrace (NZ) 
 Silent Witness (AUS) 
 Mister Park (KOR) 
 Alice Hawthorn (GB)‡ 
 Beeswing (GB)‡ 
 Sir Ken (GB) 
 Fratello Martino (DOM) 
 Boston (USA)
 16
 Cigar (USA) 
 Citation (USA) 
 Cofresi (PR)
 Hallowed Dreams (USA) 
 Honeysuckle (GB)
 Luke Blackburn (USA) 
 Miss Woodford (USA)‡ 
 Mister Frisky (USA) 
 Sweetmeat (GB) 
 The Bard (GB) 
 Golden Sixty (AUS)
 Botafogo (ARG)
 15
 Bayardo (GB) 
 Bernborough (AUS) 
 Brigadier Gerard (GB) 
 Buckpasser (USA) 
 Carbine (NZ) 
 Galgo Jr (PR) 
 Squanderer (IND) 
 New Strong Man (KOR) 
 Gay James (AUS) 
 Pretty Polly (IRE)‡ 
 Vander Pool (USA) 
 The Flying Dutchman (GB) 
 Exclusivo (PR)
 Whaling Boat (KOR)
 14
 Bandit Bomber (USA) 
 Cadeneta (PR) 
 D' Wildcat Speed 
 Harry Bassett (USA) 
 Kukulkan (MEX) 
 Overdose (GB) 
 Hurley Road (PR) 
 Phar Lap (NZ) 
 Springfield (GB) 
 Stylish Lord (AUS) 
 Douvan (FR) 
 Friponnier (GB) 
 Prince Charlie (GB) 
 Vuelve Candy B (PR) 
 Man o' War (USA) 
 Yaucono(PR)
 13
 Camarine (GB)‡ 
 Bula (GB) (1965)
 Condado (PR)
 Cocoliso (PR) 
 Galgo Jr (Twice) (PR)
 Limerick (NZ) 
 Mollie McCarty (USA)‡ 
 Ignieto (PR) 
 Timoleon (USA)
 Effie Deans (GB)‡ 
 Planet (USA) 
 Kingston (USA) 
 Polar Star (IRE)
 Grano De Oro (IRE)

 
 12
 Creme de la Fete
 Cocoliso (PR) 
 Enable (GB) ‡ 
 Gallant Bloom (USA)‡ 
 Harkaway (1834) 
 Morvich (USA) 
 La Prevoyante 
 Tulloch (NZ) 
 No Involvement (AUS) 
 Spectacular Bid (USA) 
 Super Easy (NZ)  
 Hurley Road (PR) 
 War Zone (JAM) 
 Verset's Jet (PR) 
 Va Bank (IRE)
 Yaucono(PR) (twice) 
 Defensora (PR)‡
 11
 Azeri (USA)‡
 Buveur d'Air(FR) 
 Dainana Hoshu (JPN) 
 Don Paco (PR) 
 Eurythmic (AUS)
 Home Guard (SAF)
 Kingston Town (AUS)
 Perfeccion (PR)
 Native Dancer (USA) 
 Nijinsky (CAN)
 Oju Chosan (JPN) 
 Pink Lloyd (CAN) 
 Somerset Fair 
 Songbird (USA)‡ 
 Faugheen (IRE)
 Kelso (USA)* 
 Miracle Man (JAM)
 Royal Dad (JAM) 
 Taka O (JPN) 
 Tom Fool (USA) 
 Tosa Midori (JPN)
 The Harrovian (AUS) 
 The Kid (PR) 
 War Admiral (USA)
 Wizard (JPN)
 Yaucono(PR)
 10
 Annie Power (IRE) 
 Arquitecto (PR)
 Bambera (VEN)‡
 Baaeed (GB)
 Beauty Generation (NZ) 
 Better Than Ever (AUS) 
 Count Fleet (USA)
 Co Tack (AUS)
 Condado (PR) 
 Galgo Jr (PR) 
 Kindergarten (NZ)
 King Speed (JPN)
 Leonardo (PAN)
 Lost in the Fog (USA)
 Piko 
 Quijano (GER) 
 Ruffian (USA)‡ 
 Sir Fever (URU) 
 Spectacular Bid (USA) 
 Surround (NZ)‡ 
 Sprinter Sacre (FR)
 Muad'dib
 Native Dancer (USA) 
 Awesome Feather (USA)‡ 
 Mac Diarmida (USA)
 Shinny (USA)
 Solow (GB) 
 Star Guitar (USA) 
 Stradivarius (IRE) 
 Sysonby (USA) 
 Totally Evil (USA) 
 Runnin'toluvya (USA) 
 Sarazen (USA)
 Mended (USA)‡
 Exclusivo (PR)
‡ Filly or mare

*The ninth race in Kelso's streak was earned via disqualification.

Timoleon (1813) won 13 consecutive races and sired National Museum of Racing and Hall of Fame horse Boston (1833), who started in about 45 races, winning 40, including 15 in succession. Boston then sired Lexington, who had 7 starts for 6 wins and a place. Lexington in turn sired Kentucky (23 starts, 21 wins), plus the undefeated Asteroid and Norfolk.

Horses with long sequences of jumping victories include Sir Ken, who won 16 hurdle races in England; and Poethlyn, who won 11 steeplechases in succession, including two Grand National races.

Most wins in one season

 46
 Lenoxbar
 38
 Condado (PR) – 1937 
37
Chorisbar – 1941
35
Condado (PR) – 1940
32
Yaucono (PR) – 1939
30
Jorrocks (AUS) – 1846, also known as The Iron Gelding, won 30 of his 31 starts , carrying no less than nine stone (126 lbs) over the usual distances of two or three miles
Galgo Jr (PR) – 1931
Condado (PR) – 1938
29
Camarero (PR) – 1955
28
Chorisbar – 1940,1942
27
Condado (PR) – 1939
 25
 Galgo Jr (PR) – 1935
 23
 Fisherman (GB) – 1856; as a three-year-old, winning from 1/2 mile to 3 miles
 Bachiller (PR) – 1945
 Chorisbar – 1945, 1946
 Yaucono (PR) – 1942
 22
 Luke Blackburn (USA) – 1880
 Fisherman (GB) – 1857
 21
 Fisherman (GB) 
 Picnic in the Park (AUS) from 23 starts including breaking down in final race
 Top Ace (AUS) 
 Imp (USA) – 1898
 Galgo Jr (PR) – 1930 
 Lilian (GB) – 1874 
 Alice Hawthorn (GB) – 1844; won 20 races and one dead-heat
 Yaucono (PR) – 1938,1941,1943
 20
 Hanover (USA) – 1887 
 19
 Bachiller (PR) – 1948 
 Citation (USA) – 1948
 Cocoliso (PR) – 1944 in 20 starts;
 Camarero (PR) – 1954
 Roseben (USA) – 1905 
 Rapid Redux (USA) – 2011 
 Phar Lap (AUS)
 Vuelve Candy B. (PR) – 1993
 Galgo Jr (PR) – 1932
 18
 Bo Judged (USA) – 1989 
 Hindoo (USA) – 1881
 Clifford (USA) – 1893
 Camarero (PR) – 1953
 Galgo Jr (PR) – 1934
 17
 Kincsem (HUN) – 1877
 Capa Prieto (PR) – 1982
 Yaucono (PR) – 1940
 16
 A Shin Accelern (JPN) – 2008
 Bachiller (PR) – 1946 
 Chorisbar – 1947 
 Cocoliso (PR) – 1943
 Provideo (IRE) – 1984 
 Timeless Times 
 Sweetmeat (GB) – 1845 
 The Bard (GB) – 1883
 Princesa (PR) – 1973
 Wiso G (PR) – 1968
 Yaucono (PR) – 1944
 15
 Alsab (USA) – 1941
 Beverley Park (USA) – 2022
 Condado (PR) – 1941 
 Mainbrace (NZ) 
 Old Rosebud (USA) – 1917
 Kingston (USA) – 1891
 Kincsem (HUN) – 1878
 Pan Zareta (USA) – 1913, 1915
 Round Table (USA) – 1957
 Vuelve Candy B. (PR) – 1991
 Taka O (JPN) – 1954
 14
 Ajax (FR)
 Desert Gold (NZ)
 Phar Lap (NZ)
 Tulloch (NZ) 
 Twilight Tear (USA) – 1944
 Billy Kelly (USA) – 1918
 Round Table (USA) – 1958
 Kingston (USA) – 1889
 Galgo Jr (PR) – 1933
 Golden Hare –  2007 
 13
 Bambera (VEN) – 2009
 Cheers Fancy (JPN) – 1993
 Chorisbar – 1939
 Cocoliso (PR) – 1942 
 Fab's Cowboy (AUS) – 2016/17 
 Firenze (USA) – 1888
 Gloaming (AUS)
 Grey Way (NZ)
 La Mistica (PR)  – 2001
 Nagwa (GB) – 1975 
 Spindrifter (FR) – 1980 
 Uncle Remus 
 El Manut (PAN) – 1978 
 Whirlaway (USA) – 1941
 Hurley Road – 1981
 Buckpasser (USA) – 1966 
 Ben Brush (USA) – 1895 
 Kingston (USA) – 1887, 1892
 Music Express – 1990
 Tremont (USA) – 1886
 Henry of Navarre (USA) – 1894
 Vuelve Candy B. (PR) – 1992, 1994
 Pan Zareta (USA) – 1912, 1914, 1917
 12
 Beldame (USA) – 1904
 Bricola (USA) – 2000
 Colin (USA) – 1907
 Cherokee Pepper (PR)
 Chorisbar – 1938
 Cocoliso (PR) – 1945, 1946 
 Difficult Doll (USA) – 2000 
 D' Wildcat Speed (USA) –2003 
 Emperor of Norfolk (USA) – 1887
 Govenors Ego (USA) – 2000
 Firenze (USA) – 1888
 Kingston Town (AUS)
 Kincsem (HUN)
 La Policlinica (PR) – 2002
 La Prevoyante (USA) – 1972
 Surround (NZ) 
 Mac Diarmida (USA) – 1978
 Mi Preferido (PR) – 2006
 Zev (USA) – 1923
 Coaltown (USA) – 1949
 Damascus (USA) – 1967
 Roamer (USA) – 1914 
 Mister Frisky (USA) – 1989
 Parole (USA) – 1881
 Verset's Dancer (PR) – 1983 
 Verset's Jet (PR) – 1995 
 Whirlaway (USA) – 1942
 Old Rosebud (USA) – 1913
 11
 Almendra (PR) – 1972 
 Arriesgado (USA) – 2018 
 A Shin Accelern (JPN) – 2009
 Call Me Mr. Vain (USA) – 2003 
 Dusty's Lil Book (USA) – 2002 
 Man o' War (USA) – 1920
 Armed (USA) – 1946, 1947
 Duke of Magenta (USA) – 1878
 Don Paco (PR) – 2011
 Don Piero (PR) – 2001
 Estrellero (PR) – 2001
 Mediavilla R (PR) – 2002
 Poseidon (AUS) – 1906/7
 Proud Miss 
 Shotgun Pro – 2000 
 Soba (GB) – 1982 
 Tejano Couture – 2002 
 Vindaloo (GB) – 1995 
 Red Craze (NZ)
 Cicada (USA) – 1961
 Discovery (USA) – 1935
 Seabiscuit (USA) – 1937
 Bold Ruler (USA) – 1957
 Princess Doreen (USA) – 1925
 La Voyageuse (CAN) – 1980
 Botafogo (ARG) – 1917
 10
 Armed (USA) – 1945
 Bernborough (AUS)
 Blow the Whistle (USA) – 2018
 Bo Judged (USA) – 1988 
 Busher (USA) – 1945
 Cantchaco (USA) – 2017 
 Carbine (NZ)
 Cigar (USA) – 1995
 Clifford (USA) – 1894
 Count Fleet (USA) – 1942
 Dojima Fighter (JPN) – 1998 
 Diplomatical (USA) – 2003 
 El Rebelde (PR) – 1966 
 Exclusive Valley (PR) – 2002 
 Equipoise (USA) – 1932
 Esplendorosa (PR) – 2018
 Exterminator (USA) – 1920, 1922
 Gamblin Time (USA) – 2002
 Hillsdale (USA) – 1959
 Hot Rodin (USA) – 2018
 Kindergarten (NZ)
 Kincsem (HUN) – 1876
 Kingston (USA) – 1888
 Lady Aloha (USA) – 2002
 Lady's Secret (USA) – 1985, 1986
 Man o' War (USA) – 1919
 Mended (USA) – 2017 
 Miracle Man (JAM) – 2006
 Mi Preferido (PR) – 2007
 Miss Woodford (USA) – 1883
 Nashua (USA) – 1955
 Ormonde (GB)
 Persie (USA) – 2018
 Pikotazo (MEX) – 1980
 Purple Ruckus – 2002
 Rising Fast (NZ)
 Sarazen (USA) – 1923
 Sicótico (DOM) – 2008 
 Six Ninety One (USA) – 2021 
 Spectacular Bid (USA) – 1979
 Storming On Merit (USA) – 2003
 Trafalgar 
 Tom Fool (USA) – 1953
 Tosmah (USA) – 1964
 Tuscalee (USA) – 1966
 Wizard (JPN)  – 1953

Most group / grade one (G1) wins

To identify the highest quality races, the pattern race system was introduced in Europe in 1971, followed by the graded stakes system in North America in 1974. Other countries followed suit, though the criteria and quality has not always been consistent between racing jurisdictions. The following list considers horses that won grade one / group one races that were open for International competition. Winners of local (restricted) group / grade one wins are not included.

The horses with ten or more such G1 race wins are:
 25 – Winx (AUS)‡
 22 – Hurricane Fly (IRE)
 16 – John Henry (USA), Kauto Star (FR)
 15 – Black Caviar (AUS)‡
 14 – Affirmed (USA), Forego (USA), Goldikova (IRE)‡, Kingston Town (AUS), Melody Belle (NZ)‡, Istabraq (IRE)
 13 – Bayakoa (ARG)‡, Honeysuckle‡, Moscow Flyer (IRE), Spectacular Bid (USA), Sunline (NZ)‡, Tie the Knot (AUS), Zenyatta (USA)‡
 11 – Apple's Jade (FRA)‡, Beholder (USA)‡, Cigar (USA), Enable‡ (GB), Lady's Secret (USA)‡, Lonhro (AUS), Manikato (AUS), McDynamo (USA), Rough Habit (NZ), Serena's Song‡ (USA), Verry Elleegant (NZ) ‡, Wise Dan (USA), Azeri (USA)‡
 10 – Altior (IRE), Beef or Salmon (IRE), Big Buck's (FRA), Brave Inca (IRE), Dahlia (USA)‡, Faugheen (IRE), Frankel (GB), Miesque (USA)‡, Paseana (ARG)‡, Octagonal (NZ), Mufhasa (NZ), Skip Away (USA), So You Think (NZ),

‡ Mare

In 1902 Sceptre became the only racehorse to win four British Classic Races outright. Previously, in 1868, Formosa won the same four races but dead-heated in the 2,000 Guineas Stakes.

Successive group / grade one (G1) wins
This list shows horses who won a series of Grade/Group 1 races without a loss and without an intervening race at a lower level of competition.
 11 - Honeysuckle‡
 10 – Winx‡
 9 – Zenyatta‡, Frankel, Hurricane Fly
 8 – Black Caviar‡
 7 – Rock of Gibraltar, Sprinter Sacre, Miss Terrible (ARG)‡,
 6 – Alpinista, Baaeed, Mill Reef, Invasor, Sea the Stars, Good Night Shirt, Sistercharlie‡
 5 – Almond Eye (JPN)‡, American Pharoah, Affirmed, Cigar, Constitution Hill, Douvan, Dubai Millennium, Easy Goer, Enable‡, Go For Wand‡, Giant's Causeway, Gun Runner, McDynamo, Paseana Rachel Alexandra‡, Seattle Slew, Solow, Spectacular Bid, Skip Away, Stardom Bound‡, Wise Dan, St Mark’s Basilica

‡ Mare

Successive Stakes wins
 33 – Winx‡
 23 – Black Caviar‡
 17 – Zenyatta‡
16 – El Manut (PAN)
 15 – Citation, Man o War
 13 – Cigar, Colin, Tremont
 12 – Brigadier Gerard, Spectacular Bid, Frankel
 11 – Enable‡, Kingston Town, Ormonde, Pink Lloyd, Tom Fool, Va Bank
 10 – Star Guitar, Songbird‡, Stradivarius, Sysonby

‡ = Filly or mare

Once-defeated horses
Below is a list of Thoroughbred racehorses who were defeated once. The list is not comprehensive for otherwise unnotable horses with fewer than ten wins.

Horses such as Wheel of Fortune, Barbaro, Ruffian and Vanity (1812, either 10:9-0-0 or 12:11-0-0) sustained injury or broke down in their only defeat.

$10 million prizewinning horses
 
The following horses have earned over $10 million in prize money. Most of them raced (at least in part) in Japan, Hong Kong, Australia and/or Dubai due to large purse sizes. Where applicable, the conversion to US$ was made at the time the horse raced so does not reflect current exchange rates. Different methodologies for currency conversions may result in slightly different rankings.
 Orfevre (JPN) JPY 1,576,213,000 (US$19,005,276)
 Winx (AUS) A$26,421,176 (US$18,943,757)
 Gentildonna (JPN) JPY 1,326,210,000 (US$18,468,392)
Almond Eye (JPN) JPY  1,915,263,900 (US$$17,608,586)
 Arrogate (USA) US$17,422,600
 Buena Vista (JPN) JPY 1,478,869,700 (US$17,018,548)
 Kitasan Black (JPN) JPY 1,876,843,000 JPN yen, (US$16,572,523)
 Thunder Snow (IRE) US$16,391,476
 T M Opera O (Japan) JPY 1,835,189,000 (US$16,200,337)
 Gun Runner (USA) US$15,988,500
Mishriff (IRE) £11,090,523 (US$15,252,796)
 Gold Ship (JPN) JPY 1,397,767,000 (US$15,040,217)
 Country Grammer (USA) ($14,777,320) 
 California Chrome (USA) (US$14,752,650)
 Panthalassa (JPN) $14,418,903 
Enable (GB) £10,692,563 (US$14,020,645)
 Vodka (JPN) JPY 1,333,565,800 (US$13,147,826)
 Nature Strip (AUS) A$17,949,785 (US$13,037,866)
 Victoire Pisa (JPN) JPY 1,465,416,058.53 (US$12,891,734)
 Deep Impact (JPN) JPY 1,454,551,000 (US$12,825,285)
 Redzel (AUS) A$16,444,000 (US$12,385,620)
 Narita Brian (JPN) JPY 1,026,916,000 (US$12,026,101)
 Maximum Security (USA) US$11,891,900
 Symboli Kris S (USA) JPY 984,724,000 (US$11,531,995)
 Smart Falcon (JPN) JPY 990,736,000 (US$11,470,635)
Espoir City (JPN) JPY 1,023,197,000 (US$11,443,812)
Vermilion (JPN) 1,168,607,500 yen (US$11,139,125)
 Lys Gracieux (JPN) 887,381,000 (US$11,023,327)
 Beauty Generation HK$84,760,000 (US$10,806,476)
Makybe Diva (GB) A$14,526,685 (US$10,767,186) 
 Hokko Tarumae (JPN) ¥1,050,706,000 + UAE$300,000 (US$10,703,689)
Curlin (USA) US$10,501,800
 Verry Elleegant (NZ) A$14,090,744 (US$10,495,156)
 Viva Pataca (GB) HK$81,297,500 (US$10,438,864.83)
 Admire Moon (JPN) (US$10,205,890) 
 Highland Reel (IRE) £7,513,355 (US$10,057,377.00)
Most of the above horses belong to the Nearco sireline, mostly through the branches established by Sunday Silence and Northern Dancer. However, Curlin, Arrogate, Winx and Gun Runner descend instead from the Native Dancer sire line through Mr. Prospector. Both Nearco and Native Dancer were grandsons of Phalaris.

North American records
In 1951, Citation became the first horse to win one million dollars. In 1979, Affirmed became the first horse to break the two million dollar barrier, finishing his career with earnings of $2.3 million. Spectacular Bid broke this record in 1980, amassing career earnings of $2.8 million. Purses began to increase sharply soon afterwards thanks in large part to the Breeders' Cup. The next record holders were John Henry, who earned $6.6 million by the end of his career in 1984 and Alysheba, with earnings of $6.7 million by the end of his career in 1988. Cigar was the next to hold the North American earnings title, finishing his career in 1998 with earnings just shy of $10 million ($9,999,815). That remained the North American record until Curlin in 2008, who earned $10.5 million. California Chrome broke this record in 2016 with career earnings of $14.8 million, and was in turn surpassed by Arrogate when he won the 2017 Dubai World Cup to take his career earnings over $17 million.

See also

 List of historical horses
 Miller's Guide
 Repeat winners of horse races
 Triple Crown of Thoroughbred Racing

References

External links
 Timeform
 International Federation of Horseracing Authorities

Horse racing-related lists
Horse, Thoroughbred
Horses